The 2018–2020 CEV Beach Volleyball Continental Cup were a beach volleyball double-gender event. Teams representing European countries were split into groups of four, where an elimination bracket determined the two teams to advance to the next stage from the sub-zones. The winners of the event qualified for the Volleyball at the 2020 Summer Olympics.

Men

Phase 1

Pool A
Pool A was contested in Novi Sad, Serbia.

  and  qualified to the Phase 2.

Pool B
Pool B was contested in London, England.

 and  qualified to the Phase 2.

Pool C
Pool C was contested in Bettystown, Ireland.

 and  qualified to the Phase 2.

Pool D
Pool D was contested in Schinias, Greece.

 and  qualified to the Phase 2.

Pool E
Pool E was contested in Portorož, Slovenia.

 and  qualified to the Phase 2.

Pool F
Pool F was contested in Batumi, Georgia.

 and  qualified to the Phase 2.

Pool G
Pool G was contested in Umag, Croatia.

 and  qualified to the Phase 2.

Pool H
Pool H was contested in Larnaka, Cyprus.

 and  qualified to the Phase 2.

Women

Ranking
Organizer of the Final (3rd Phase), qualifies directly to the 3rd Phase.

The top 8 in CEV Country Ranking as of 30 September 2018 qualified to the 2nd Phase.

Phase 1
Pool A was contested in Novi Sad, Serbia.

  and  qualified to the Phase 2.

Pool B
Pool B was contested in London, England.

 and  qualified to the Phase 2.

Pool C
Pool C was contested in Bettystown, Ireland.

 and  qualified to the Phase 2.

Pool D
Pool D was contested in Schinias, Greece.

 and  qualified to the Phase 2.

Pool E
Pool E was contested in Portorož, Slovenia.

 and  qualified to the Phase 2.

Pool F
Pool F was contested in Batumi, Georgia.

 and  qualified to the Phase 2.

Pool G
Pool G was contested in Umag, Croatia.

|}

 and  qualified to the Phase 2.

Pool H
Pool H was contested in Larnaka, Cyprus.

  and  qualified to the Phase 2.

Phase 2

Final round
Host: The Hague, Netherlands

Bracket

Round of 16

|}

Quarterfinals

|}

Semifinals

|}

Final

|}

References

External links
Official website

Continental Beach Volleyball Cup
2018 in beach volleyball
2019 in beach volleyball
2020 in beach volleyball